Vlastimir was a medieval Serbian prince. The name Vlastimir is of the Slavic roots vlastiti ("to rule") and mir ("peace"). It may refer to:

Vlastimir Đorđević (born 1948), Serbian colonel general
Vlastimir Jovanović (born 1985), Bosnian football defensive midfielder
Vlastimir Pavlović Carevac (1895–1965), Serbian violinist and conductor
Vlastimir Đuza Stojiljković (1929–2015), Serbian actor
Vlastimir Trajković (1947–2017), Serbian composer and professor
Vlastimir Vukadinović (born 1982), Serbian basketball coach
Vlastimir Sretenovic (born 1991), Serbian rugby player
Vlastimir Peričić (1927–2000), Serbian composer

See also
Vlastimil
Vladimir (disambiguation)

Slavic masculine given names
Serbian masculine given names